Homoquinolinic acid (HQA) is a potent excitotoxin which is a conformationally-restricted analogue of N-methyl-D-aspartate (NMDA) and a partial agonist of the main/glutamate site of the NMDA receptor, with some selectivity for NR2B subunit-containing receptors. It is approximately equipotent to NMDA and about five times more potent than quinolinic acid as an agonist of the NMDA receptor. HQA has also been found to label a novel, yet uncharacterized binding site, which can be distinguished from the NMDA receptor with the use of 2-carboxy-3-carboxymethylquinoline (CCMQ), a selective ligand of the uncharacterized site.

See also 
 Aspartate
 Ibotenic acid
 Tetrazolylglycine

References 

Dicarboxylic acids
Convulsants
Neurotoxins
NMDA receptor agonists
Pyridines
Excitotoxins
Aromatic acids